Jill Louise Scott  (born 2 February 1987) is an English former professional footballer who played as a midfielder. The FIFA technical report into the 2011 Women's World Cup described Scott as one of England's four outstanding players; "[an] energetic, ball-winning midfielder who organises the team well, works hard at both ends of the pitch and can change her team's angle of attack."

At , Scott is nicknamed "Crouchy" after male international footballer Peter Crouch. After leaving home town club Sunderland for Everton in 2006, she contributed to the Blues' FA Women's Premier League Cup win in 2008 and FA Women's Cup victory in 2010. On the individual level, Scott was voted 2008 FA Players' Player of the Year and 2011 FA International Player of the Year.

Scott won the 22nd UK series of I'm a Celebrity...Get Me Out of Here! and was crowned 'Queen of the Jungle'.

Early life
Scott grew up in Sunderland, Tyne and Wear, and attended Monkwearmouth Comprehensive School. A keen long-distance runner, Scott ran for Sunderland Harriers, winning the North of England Under-13 cross-country title and the Junior Great North Run, whilst playing football for Boldon Girls. At age 13, she had to decide between football or running, and chose to concentrate on playing football.

After leaving school in 2003, Scott received a BTEC National Diploma in Sport and Exercise Science at Gateshead College. She remained at the college to study for a University of Sunderland foundation degree in sports and exercise development. She also played for the college football team alongside fellow Sunderland and international teammate Carly Telford. After completing her diploma, both Scott and Telford enrolled at Loughborough University to study sport.

Club career

Sunderland
Scott began her senior career with Sunderland Women. In October 2005, aged only 18 years, she won the Women's Player of the Month award for September, based on her performances for both her club and country (at under-19 level).

Everton
Scott joined Everton Ladies in July 2006, having turned down an approach from Doncaster Rovers Belles. Her first game for Everton came the following month, a 3–0 defeat against Arsenal Ladies in the FA Women's Community Shield.

At the end of the 2007–08 season, she picked up the FA Tesco Players' Player of the Year award. Also nominated were Arsenal's Alex Scott and Karen Carney. In April 2012, Scott was appointed as one of eight digital media ambassadors, one from each team, who wear their Twitter account name on their shirt sleeves to raise the profile of the WSL. Scott decided to leave Everton at the end of the 2013 season.

During her first spell at Everton, Scott won the FA Women's Premier League Cup and the FA Women's Cup, playing in both finals.

Manchester City

After leaving Everton, Scott signed a two-year deal with Manchester City. This move proved a success, as she played her part in securing the Continental Cup Trophy for Manchester City in 2014.

In April 2015, Scott was shown the red card and banned for three matches for headbutting Arsenal's Jade Bailey during Manchester City's 1–0 defeat. In the 2017 FA Cup Final, Scott scored in a 4–1 win against Birmingham City.

In June 2020, Scott signed a new two-year contract which saw her take up a coaching role at the club. At the 2020 Women's FA Community Shield on 29 August 2020, Scott was shown a red card for two bookable offences in Manchester City's scrappy 2–0 defeat by Chelsea at Wembley Stadium.

Return to Everton (loan)
On 21 January 2021, Scott returned to Everton on loan for the remainder of the 2020–21 season.

Aston Villa (loan) 
On 25 January 2022, Scott signed for Aston Villa on loan until the end of the season.

On 23 August 2022, Scott announced her retirement from football.

International career

England

At junior level, Scott played for the England Under-19s side, scoring three times in three games as England won through the first round of qualifying for the 2006 UEFA Under-19s tournament. Her first call-up to the England senior squad came in May 2006, having captained the Under-19s side for the previous 18 months. She made her debut for the England senior team against the Netherlands in August 2006, coming on as a late substitute for Kelly Smith in a 4–0 win. She made the squad for the 2007 World Cup, coming on as a substitute in England's opening match against Japan. She went on to start the remainder of England's matches in the tournament, scoring her first international goal in the 6–1 demolition of Argentina in the group stage. England bowed out at the quarter-final stage after a 3–0 defeat against the United States.

In May 2009, Scott was one of the first 17 female players to be given central contracts by The Football Association. She was named in coach Hope Powell's squad for the 2009 UEFA Women's European Championships, scoring a late winner as England beat the Netherlands in the semi-final, having come on as a substitute for Jessica Clarke at the beginning of extra-time.

At the 2011 FIFA Women's World Cup, Scott scored against New Zealand in England's 2–1 group B win. She put England ahead against France in the quarter final, but did not take a penalty in her team's 3–4 shootout defeat following a 1–1 draw. In February 2019, Scott pulled out of the England squad for the SheBelieves Cup.

Scott was appointed Member of the Order of the British Empire (MBE) in the 2020 New Year Honours for services to women's football.

On 23 February 2021, Scott made her 150th appearance for the England team in a game against Northern Ireland, which she would captain and play the whole 90 minutes as England would win 6–0.

In June 2022, Scott was included in the England squad which won the UEFA Women's Euro 2022. On 23 August 2022, Scott announced her retirement from football, a day after England and Manchester City teammate Ellen White did. Scott retired as England's second-most capped international footballer (men and women), behind Fara Williams.

Great Britain
In June 2012, Scott was named in an 18–player Great Britain squad for the 2012 London Olympics.

In 2021, Scott was announced as one of the 22 player squad for the 2020 Tokyo Olympics.

Personal life
In March 2020, she announced her engagement to long-term partner Shelly Unitt. Scott sometimes works at Boxx2Boxx Coffee, a coffee shop in Manchester owned by Unitt.

In November 2022, Scott won the 22nd series of I'm a Celebrity...Get Me Out of Here! and was crowned 'Queen of the Jungle'.

Career statistics

Club

International

International goals
Scores and results list England or Great Britain's goal tally first

Coaching career
In September 2008, Scott was appointed as the coach of the Women's Football Academy at Gateshead College, with former Darlington manager Mick Tait taking over as coach of the Men's Academy.

Honours
Everton
FA Women's Premier League Cup: 2007–08
FA Women's Cup: 2009–10

Manchester City
FA WSL Cup: 2014, 2016, 2018–19
FA WSL: 2016
FA Women's Cup: 2016–17, 2018–19, 2019–20

England

FIFA Women's World Cup third place: 2015
UEFA Women's Championship: 2022; runner-up: 2009 
Cyprus Cup: 2009, 2013, 2015
Arnold Clark Cup: 2022

Individual
 Freedom of the City of London (announced 1 August 2022)
 Freedom of the City of Sunderland (8 March 2023)

See also
 List of women's footballers with 100 or more caps
 List of England women's international footballers
 List of players who have appeared in multiple FIFA Women's World Cups
 List of people from Sunderland

References

Further reading
 Aluko, Eniola (2019), They Don't Teach This, Random House, 
 Caudwell, Jayne (2013), Women's Football in the UK: Continuing with Gender Analyses, Taylor & Francis, 
 Clarke, Gemma (2019), Soccerwomen: The Icons, Rebels, Stars, and Trailblazers Who Transformed the Beautiful Game, 
 Dunn, Carrie (2019), Pride of the Lionesses: The Changing Face of Women's Football in England, Pitch Publishing (Brighton) Limited, 
 Dunn, Carrie (2016), The Roar of the Lionesses: Women's Football in England, Pitch Publishing Limited, 
 Grainey, Timothy (2012), Beyond Bend It Like Beckham: The Global Phenomenon of Women's Soccer, University of Nebraska Press, 
 Smith, Kelly (2012), Footballer: My Story, Transworld, 
 Stay, Shane (2019), The Women's World Cup 2019 Book: Everything You Need to Know About the Soccer World Cup, Books on Demand, 
 Theivam, Kieran and Jeff Kassouf (2019), The Making of the Women's World Cup: Defining stories from a sport’s coming of age, Little,

External links

Profile  at the Manchester City F.C. website
Profile at the Football Association website

1987 births
Living people
English women's footballers
Lesbian sportswomen
British LGBT footballers
English LGBT sportspeople
Sunderland A.F.C. Ladies players
Everton F.C. (women) players
Aston Villa W.F.C. players
England women's international footballers
FA Women's National League players
People educated at Monkwearmouth School
Alumni of Loughborough University
Women's Super League players
Footballers from Sunderland
Olympic footballers of Great Britain
Manchester City W.F.C. players
Women's association football midfielders
FIFA Century Club
2007 FIFA Women's World Cup players
2011 FIFA Women's World Cup players
Footballers at the 2012 Summer Olympics
2015 FIFA Women's World Cup players
2019 FIFA Women's World Cup players
Footballers at the 2020 Summer Olympics
Members of the Order of the British Empire
UEFA Women's Euro 2022 players
UEFA Women's Championship-winning players
UEFA Women's Euro 2017 players
I'm a Celebrity...Get Me Out of Here! (British TV series) winners